Everest Community Academy is a coeducational secondary school with academy status, in Basingstoke, Hampshire. The school is part of the Bourne Education Trust. Everest is one of ten secondary schools servicing Basingstoke and Deane.

School history
The school was previously called John Hunt of Everest School. It moved site to a new building and changed name in 2007.

The Headteacher from 2007, and from the opening of the school as an academy in 2011, was Julie Rose. She left in 2014 and was succeeded by Nick Price who led the school for 3 years until 2017 then shortly overseen by Mr Alex Russel until 2018 where Hannah Dibden took over and still is the head of the school as date of writing.

When plans were announced to turn the predecessor school into an academy under the sponsorship of Academies Enterprise Trust (AET) there was local opposition, including a petition against the proposal signed by 400 parents. The local authority gave £27m in order to rebuild the school.

In summer 2017 Everest Community Academy was re-brokered by the Regional Schools Commissioner and left AET to become part of the Bourne Education Trust.

Ofsted inspections

As of 2020, the school's most recent inspection by Ofsted was in February 2020, with an outcome of Good.

School leadership 
Alex Russell provides the strategic leadership of the school and is its executive headteacher. Hannah Dibden is head of school and she is responsible for the day-to-day running of the school. She is supported by three assistant headteachers and a business manager.

Admissions 
The school's pupil admissions number is 150 per year group.

Facilities 
The school was a new build in 2007 with modern sports and performing arts facilities. It shares the site with a leisure centre.

Parent and carer engagement 
The school used an application called ClassCharts to help parents and carers keep track of their child's achievements, access behaviour reports and track scheduled detentions. This has since been replaced by the Arbor system.

Academic performance 
The school's GCSE results and trends can be found on the DFE performance tables.

References

Schools in Basingstoke
Secondary schools in Hampshire
Academies in Hampshire